Cooran is a rural hinterland town and locality in the Shire of Noosa, Queensland, Australia. In the  the locality of Cooran had a population of 1,624 people.

Geography

Cooran is predominantly farming land with its urban centre in the north of the locality. Pinbarren Creek and Six Mile Creek flow from east to west through the northern part of the locality, while Coles Creek flows from east to west through the southern part of the locality. All the creeks flow into the Mary River.

The Bruce Highway passes through the south-west corner of the locality but does not pass through the town. The major routes to the town are Traveston Road (from the north-west), Coles Creek Road from the south-west and Greenridge-Pinbarren Road from the east.

The North Coast railway line passes through the town and northern part of the locality, to the north of Traveston Road. Cooran is served by the Cooran railway station in the centre of the town.

Mount Cooran is a very distinctive peak in the landscape.

History

The name Cooran comes from guran or kuran, meaning tall in the Kabi language. This might refer to Mount Cooran or to the tall Moreton Bay Ash trees (Eucalyptus tessellaris).

Cooran Lagoon lies between the North Coast railway line and Railway Street near James Street, where the Aboriginals used it as a source of water-lily bulbs and mussels for food. The Indigenous name for the lagoon is Guran.

By 1878, the lagoon was the site of the Half Way Hotel (also known as the Half Way House) on the old Gympie-to-Tewantin coach road (also known as the Noosa Road). It was operated by William Casey, until he transferred the licence to William Martin in December 1881. Nothing remains of the hotel but the approximate site is marked with a plaque.

In December 1889, Martin transferred the hotel licence to his new Cooran Hotel at the Cooran railway station.

Cooran Post Office opened on 17 June 1889 (a receiving office had been open from 1888).

The Cooran Provisional School opened on 21 July 1890. It became Cooran State School in 1909.

In April 1906, William Martin had plans drawn up for a public hall. On Friday 17 August 1906, William Martin opened with his new hall with a free social event. It was lit by 3 Rochester lamps, each of which used one gallon of oil to produce the light of 100 candles for 12 hours.

St Matthew's Anglican Church was dedicated on 30 September 1913 by Archbishop St Clair Donaldson. It closed circa 1987.

In the 1920s and 30s, banana growing became an important industry around the town. For a period after World War II pineapple farms gained popularity in the district.

In the early 2000s, the 26-km Noosa Trail Network was linked through Cooran.

Between 2008 and 2013 Cooran (and all of Noosa Shire) was within Sunshine Coast Region.

In the 2011 census, Cooran had a population of 1,457 people.

In the  the locality of Cooran had a population of 1,624 people.

Today Cooran is a small country town and retains its rural feel, as well as its main street with its preserved historic buildings.

Heritage listings
Cooran has a number of heritage-listed sites, including:
 28 King Street: Alfredson's Joinery

Education
Cooran State School is a government primary (Prep-6) school for boys and girls at 31 James Street. In 2018, the school had an enrolment of 134 students with 15 teachers (9 full-time equivalent) and 10 non-teaching staff (6 full-time equivalent).

There is no secondary school in Cooran. The nearest secondary school is Noosa District State High School. It has a campus offering schooling to Year 8 in neighbouring Pomona to the east with schooling to Year 12 available at its campus in Cooroy to the southeast.

Amenities
Cooran Memorial School of Arts is at 14 King Street. The hall remains the oldest memorial hall in the Noosa Region. It acts as a community hall with different venues.

The Shire of Noosa operates a mobile library service on a weekly schedule in King Street.

Attractions 
The James M McKane Memorial Lookout (also known as the Tablelands Lookout) is at 526 Tablelands Road.

References

Further reading

External links

 
 
 

Suburbs of Noosa Shire, Queensland
Localities in Queensland